The Mosquito Bowl was a football game played December 24, 1944 between two regiments of Marines at Guadalcanal during World War II. Buzz Bissinger in 2022 wrote an account, The Mosquito Bowl: A Game of Life and Death in World War II, which was widely reviewed.

Members of the 6th Marine Division, many of whom had played college football, were training on Guadalcanal during the final months of 1944. Many had been named to all-conference or all-American teams. Both of the division’s 4th and 29th regiments could field a team of such prominent players, and a game was organized for Christmas Eve with sixty-five players, including John McLaughry and Tony Butkovich. 

The game ended with a scoreless tie.

References

American military occupations
American football
American football games
World War II
Guadalcanal Campaign